Valentin Vladimirovich Blazhes (29 February 1936 – 26 January 2012) was a Soviet and Russian folklorist and literary scholar, Professor of the Ural State University, Doctor of Sciences, a member of the Russian Head Council for Philological Sciences. He was an expert in the fields of Old Russian literature, folk literature and folklore, especially the folklore of the Ural region, which he became interested in as a student. He studied Russian epic poetry, folk culture and language, workers' folklore, the Remezov Chronicle, the Stroganov Chronicle, and other Old Russian Chronicles. He authored a number of articles on historical, toponymic, family folklore.

Biography 
Blazhes was born in the Vedyonovka village, Seryshevsky District, Amur Oblast. He served in the Soviet army from 1955 to 1958, and after that entered the Ural State University. In 1963 he graduated from the Philological Department. He worked for two years as a teacher at Russian school near Sysert. In 1967 he married the Latin Professor Lyudmila Dorovskikh (Людмила Доровских). He then headed the Folklore and Ancient Literature Department at the university, and was a dean of the Philology Department from 1988 to 2004. He also the member of the academic senate of the United Museum of Ural Writers from 1994 to 1999. From 1993 until death he led the folkloric expeditions of the Ural University.

Selected publications 
 The pithiness of the art form in Russian legendary epos, 1977
 P. P. Bazhov and workers' folklore, 1982
 Satire and humour in the prerevolutionary folklore of Ural workers, 1987

References

External links
  List of publications

People from Amur Oblast
1936 births
2012 deaths
Russian literary historians
Russian philologists
Soviet folklorists
Russian folklorists
Soviet literary historians
Soviet male writers
20th-century Russian male writers
Pavel Bazhov Prize recipients
Academic staff of Ural State University